Carson Dach (born September 29, 1980) is a former American football center. He played for the New York Giants in 2003.

References

1980 births
Living people
American football centers
Eastern Michigan Eagles football players
New York Giants players